Dario Potroško (born 9 October 1992) is a Croatian football player. He plays for Austrian club TUS Vorau.

Club career
He made his Austrian Football First League debut for Kapfenberger SV on 4 August 2017 in a game against WSG Wattens.

Ahead of the 2019-20 season, Potroško joined TUS Vorau.

References

External links
 
 Austrian career stats - ÖFB

1992 births
Living people
Sportspeople from Koprivnica
Association football midfielders
Croatian footballers
NK Slaven Belupo players
NK Koprivnica players
NK Vrbovec players
Kapfenberger SV players
2. Liga (Austria) players
Austrian Landesliga players
Austrian 2. Landesliga players
Croatian expatriate footballers
Expatriate footballers in Austria
Croatian expatriate sportspeople in Austria